Peter Jensen Reid Skellerup  (also Skjellerup, 14 January 1918 – 15 May 2006) was a New Zealand industrialist and philanthropist.

Early life
Skellerup was born in Christchurch in 1918. His father was George Skellerup (1881–1955), the founder of rubber manufacturing company Skellerup Industries. His mother was Elizabeth, née Reid. His father was born in Australia but the family stemmed from Denmark, with his father's birth name including a silent "j" that he dropped from the name at some point. On their birth certificates, the original spelling Skjellerup was used for all five siblings born between 1907 (his brother Valdemar was the oldest) and 1918 (Peter was the youngest). The three middle siblings were girls. Frank Skjellerup, an Australian amateur astronomer, was his uncle. Peter received his education at Christchurch Boys' High School. He saw service in World War II with the 37th Battalion of the 2nd New Zealand Expeditionary Force in the Solomon Islands fighting again Japan.

Commercial life
Upon leaving school in 1934, he became an office boy in one of his father's companies, the Latex Rubber Company.

He took over as joint managing director in 1955 upon his father's death alongside his brother Valdemar. In 1977, he became deputy chairman of the Skellerup parent company. In 1982, he was handed full control by his brother not long before his brother's death.

Public office
Skellerup was first elected to Christchurch City Council in 1958 and served almost continuously until 1980. The Labour Party won the 1957 general election and upon the Second Labour Government being formed, several sitting city councillors received high-ranking positions in government and resigned from their local roles. This triggered the 1958 Christchurch local by-election, where four city councillor positions were contested by nine candidates. Skellerup, standing for the conservative Citizens' ticket, came fourth and was thus elected. In the 1959 Christchurch local election, the Citizens' ticket won all 19 city council seats, with Skellerup coming fifth (the mayor, George Manning, was from the Labour Party). Skellerup came sixth in 1962. In the 1965 local election, Skellerup stood for both the city council and the mayoralty. He was decisively defeated by the mayoral incumbent, Manning, but came second in the city council election (once again for 19 positions). In 1968, Skellerup stood for council only and came second. During this term, Skellerup lost his council seat over a technicality; he had breached the Local Authorities (Members’ Interests) Act 1968.

In the lead up to the 1971 election, Skellerup was publicly critical of the Citizens' mayor, Ron Guthrey, over his proposal to build a road through North Hagley Park. Skellerup had never been fond of Guthrey and as a past chairman of the Parks and Reserves Committee, he was extremely annoyed by Guthrey going behind his back and announcing the road proposal without checking with him first. At the election, Guthrey was defeated, Labour gained a majority on the city council, but Skellerup was the highest-polling council candidate by a large margin.

The 1974 election was a turnaround, with Labour's incumbent Pickering defeated by the Citizens' candidate Hamish Hay. According to Hay, Skellerup was not considered as the Citizens' mayoral candidate over the furore that he had caused for Guthrey. The Citizens' ticket also gained a majority on the city council and from 1974 to 1980, Skellerup was deputy-mayor to Hay.

Skellerup was also a member of the Lyttelton Harbour Board for twelve years, for three of those he was the chairman. Since 1964, he was Consul of Denmark, first for the South Island and later for all of New Zealand.

Family, recognition and death
In 1941, he married Rita Margaret Grogan (26 August 1919 – 1985); they were to have one son and three daughters. His wife died in 1985. His second marriage was to Evelyn Rogers, who died in 1999.

In 1974, he was awarded Knight of the Order of the Dannebrog by Denmark. In the 1979 New Year Honours, Skellerup was appointed a Commander of the Order of the British Empire, for services to the City of Christchurch. Skellerup sponsored the Antarctic wing at Canterbury Museum and to recognise his contribution, Skellerup Glacier in New Zealand's Ross Dependency in Antarctica was named for him.

Skellerup died in Christchurch on 15 May 2006, and was buried at Ruru Lawn Cemetery. He was survived by the four children from his first marriage.

Notes

References

Sources

1918 births
2006 deaths
People educated at Christchurch Boys' High School
20th-century New Zealand businesspeople
Knights of the Order of the Dannebrog
New Zealand Commanders of the Order of the British Empire
Christchurch City Councillors
Lyttelton Harbour Board members
Burials at Ruru Lawn Cemetery
Deputy mayors of Christchurch
New Zealand military personnel of World War II